Mauro Da Dalto (born 8 April 1981) is an Italian professional road bicycle racer, who last rode for UCI ProTeam . Born in Conegliano, Da Dalto started in the Marchiol-Ima-Famila team, the semi-professional branch of the Liquigas-team for neo-professionals.

Career achievements

Major results
Da Dalto has won one stage in his career, before he started as a full professional.

2004
1st Stage 4 Giro delle Valli Cuneesi nelle Alpi del Mare
2005
1st Coppa Caduti di Reda

Grand Tour general classification results timeline

Notes and references

External links 

Profile at Liquigas official website

Italian male cyclists
1981 births
Living people
Cyclists from the Province of Treviso
People from Conegliano